Sa'ad (lit. Aid)  is a religious kibbutz in the Negev desert in southern Israel. Located near the Gaza Strip, and the cities of Sderot and Netivot, it falls under the jurisdiction of Sdot Negev Regional Council.

Due to its proximity to Gaza, the kibbutz has been the target of numerous rocket attacks.

History

The kibbutz was founded on 30 June 1947, the day after Operation Agatha, by graduates of the Bnei Akiva movement. It was established in a manner similar to the tower and stockade settlement campaign of the late 1930s, and was the first religious kibbutz to be founded by Sabras.
During the 1948 War, the kibbutz was almost entirely destroyed by the Egyptian army. The local museum "Ma'oz Mul 'Aza" (Stronghold at Gaza) details the history of the war in this area, opposite the Gaza strip.

Following the war, the kibbutz members renewed their cultivation of the land, developing over the following fifty years, a multi-generational population that generates its income from agriculture and industry.

Economy
Sa'ad is one of Israel's largest producers of carrots, with a quarter of the country's production. Other crops include potatoes, avocados, almonds and citrus fruit. Sa'ad has a large dairy farm and a poultry farm.

Sa'ad's industries include Syfan, a plant that manufactures plastic shrink film for packaging, and Popli, which supplies popcorn products and pet food.

The kibbutz also has a fashion outlet called Kav LeKav, which sells clothes for men, women, and children; Ahinoam Jewelry which produces handmade jewelry in sterling silver; a graphic design studio "Kesem"; and an auto service center.

The kibbutz also operates Beit Shikma, a convalescent and geriatric home for patients who require full-time care.

The dairy farm on the kibbutz was the Israeli leader in 2011 for productivity with an average of 13 785 litres per head that year. A dairy cow named Kharta, was the world record holder giving 18 208 litres of milk.

Education
The kibbutz runs and participates in several unique educational frameworks such as Youth Education, a school and dormitory framework for teenagers from broken homes; Foster Family, for grade school children; Conversion Ulpan, for families and young people who are converting to Judaism; and Nativ, the USY year program in Israel for American teens.

Kibbutz Sa'ad has a regional religious elementary school for grades 1 through 9 under the auspices of Israel's Ministry of Education. Kibbutz Sa'ad, Kibbutz Alumim, and Moshav Tkuma cooperate in running the Da'at School for their children. Pupils from towns in the surrounding area also attend.

References

External links

Official website 

Kibbutzim
Religious Kibbutz Movement
Populated places established in 1947
Gaza envelope
1947 establishments in Mandatory Palestine
Populated places in Southern District (Israel)